is a Japanese former professional baseball third baseman. Nakamura spent almost all of his professional career in Japan with the Osaka Kintetsu Buffaloes. Nakamura had a .266 career batting average, 404 home runs and 1338 RBI, and was an eight-time All-Star and four-time Golden Glove winner. Nakamura is one of only 16 players to have hit 400 or more home runs in NPB.

Career

1992–2004: Osaka Kintetsu Buffaloes 

2002–2005: Dalliances with MLB 
In , he agreed to a two-year, $7 million contract with the New York Mets, but, after word leaked out before he could formally notify the Osaka Kintetsu Buffaloes management, Nakamura rejected the deal, saying that "I cannot trust such a team which leaked this information at its own Web site" (not knowing that each team's site is managed by Major League Baseball), and re-signed with Kintetsu over considerable controversy.

In , he suffered a torn knee cartilage, and his offensive numbers began to decline.

In , Nakamura walked away from a guaranteed $10 million two-year contract in Japan to sign a $500,000 non-guaranteed minor league deal with the Dodgers as a non-roster invitee to spring training. He made his Major League Baseball debut for the Dodgers on April 10, . Highly touted from his playing days in Japan, he received the opportunity to win the Dodgers starting third base role after the Dodgers lost their starting third baseman, Adrián Beltré, to free agency in the offseason. However, Nakamura managed only a .128 batting average with no home runs and 3 runs batted in. He was optioned to the Las Vegas 51s, the Dodgers Triple-A affiliate, by mid-May. He would remain with the 51s the remainder of the season, after which the Dodgers granted him his release. Just after being released, he said "If Ichiro had started his career under [a] minor [league] contract like me, he couldn't be called up to [the] Major League[s]","This year is a kind of penalties for me", and "I don't know why I played in [the] minor league[s]".

2006: Orix Buffaloes 
In , Nakamura re-signed with the Orix Buffaloes, playing primarily as a designated hitter. He finished 2006 with .232 average, 12 homers and 45 RBI.

2007–2008: Chunichi Dragons 
Nakamura signed a one-year deal for just 4,000,000 yen (about $34,000) as a trainee with the Chunichi Dragons on February 25, . He signed a one-year deal for 6,000,000 yen (about $50,000) as a player on March 22, 2007. His annual income declined due to many troubles, but he got over the shock and was crowned the MVP of the 2007 Japan Series, the only NPB championship of his career.

2009–2010: Tohoku Rakuten Golden Eagles 
However, he declared himself a free agent and later signed with the Tohoku Rakuten Golden Eagles after the season ended.

Yokohama BayStars 
Nakamura signed a one-year contract with the Yokohama BayStars on May 24, 2011, and was released on October 3, 2014. He officially retired in February 2015.

Post-playing career
Nakamura served as a coach at Hamamatsu Kaiseikan High School from 2017 to 2021. On November 2, 2021, Nakamura was hired by the Chunichi Dragons to serve as the team's hitting coach for the 2022 season.

See also 
 List of top Nippon Professional Baseball home run hitters

References

External links

 
 

1973 births
Baseball players at the 2000 Summer Olympics
Baseball players at the 2004 Summer Olympics
Chunichi Dragons players
Japanese expatriate baseball players in the United States
Kintetsu Buffaloes players
Las Vegas 51s players
Living people
Los Angeles Dodgers players
Major League Baseball players from Japan
Major League Baseball third basemen
Medalists at the 2004 Summer Olympics
Nippon Professional Baseball first basemen
Nippon Professional Baseball third basemen
Olympic medalists in baseball
Olympic bronze medalists for Japan
Olympic baseball players of Japan
Osaka Kintetsu Buffaloes players
Orix Buffaloes players
Baseball people from Osaka
Tohoku Rakuten Golden Eagles players
Yokohama BayStars players
Yokohama DeNA BayStars players